State Highway 95 is a New Zealand state highway connecting the town of Manapouri with Te Anau at State Highway 94. The highway is a major tourist road and skirts the eastern border of Fiordland National Park between Lake Te Anau and Lake Manapouri. The entire length of the road lies on the Southern Scenic Route between Queenstown and Dunedin via Invercargill. The road itself is largely flat and passes through agricultural land, but affords views of the scenic mountain ranges of Fiordland.

See also
List of New Zealand state highways

External links
 New Zealand Transport Agency

Transport in Southland, New Zealand
95
Fiordland